Sven Helfenstein (born July 30, 1982) is a Swiss former professional ice hockey player. Helfenstein was selected by the New York Rangers in the 6th round (175th overall) of the 2000 NHL Entry Draft.

Helfenstein made his National League A debut playing with Kloten Flyers during the 1998–99 NLA season. After helping his club Lausanne HC achieve promotion from the National League B in the 2012-2013 Season he retired. He is now a player agent and expert on Swiss TV Channel MySports(UPC).

Career statistics

Regular season and playoffs

International

References

External links

1982 births
Living people
HC Davos players
HC La Chaux-de-Fonds players
EHC Kloten players
Lausanne HC players
New York Rangers draft picks
SC Rapperswil-Jona Lakers players
SC Bern players
SCL Tigers players
Swiss ice hockey forwards
ZSC Lions players
People from Winterthur
Sportspeople from the canton of Zürich